Renny Ribera Vaca (born January 30, 1974 in Santa Cruz de la Sierra) is a retired Bolivian football right defender.

Club career
He initiated his career playing for the prestigious Tahuichi football youth academy. At professional level he played for Blooming, The Strongest and Real Potosí.

International career
He was also part of the Bolivia national team during Héctor Veira's period as manager. He played at the  1999 Copa América, the 1999 FIFA Confederations Cup (in which he scored a goal versus Egypt) and in 3 World Cup qualifiers.

Honours

Club
 Blooming (2)
 Liga de Fútbol Profesional Boliviano: 1998, 1999
 The Strongest (2)
 Liga de Fútbol Profesional Boliviano: 2003 (A), 2003 (C)
Club Bolivar

References

External links

 El drama de los jugadores nunca acaba en Bolivia at la-razon.com

1974 births
Living people
Sportspeople from Santa Cruz de la Sierra
Association football fullbacks
Bolivian footballers
Bolivia international footballers
1999 Copa América players
1999 FIFA Confederations Cup players
Bolivian Primera División players
Club Blooming players
The Strongest players
Club Real Potosí players